Douglas Keith Roth (born August 24, 1967)  is an American retired professional basketball player who was selected by the Washington Bullets in the second round (41st pick overall) of the 1989 NBA draft. A 6'11" center from the University of Tennessee, Roth played in one National Basketball Association (NBA) season for the Bullets, appearing in 42 games during the 1989–90 season.

External links
College & NBA statistics @ basketball-reference.com

1967 births
Living people
American expatriate basketball people in Germany
American men's basketball players
Basketball players from Knoxville, Tennessee
Centers (basketball)
Giessen 46ers players
McDonald's High School All-Americans
Parade High School All-Americans (boys' basketball)
Pensacola Tornados (1986–1991) players
Tennessee Volunteers basketball players
Washington Bullets draft picks
Washington Bullets players